Capitan Petchyindee Academy (born March 24, 1993) is a Thai Muay Thai fighter. He is the former ONE Bantamweight Kickboxing World Champion and Lumpinee Stadium Super Welterweight champion.

As of December 2020 he is the number 7 pound-for-pound Muay Thai fighter in the world according to The Nation. As of February 2021, he is the #5 ranked featherweight kickboxer in the world, according to Combat Press.

Fighting career
He was scheduled to defend his Lumpinee Stadium Super Welterweight title in January 2020 against Yodkhunpon Sitmonchai. Capitan won the fight by unanimous decision, and was also awarded 300,000 baht as a bonus. The two of them fought a rematch a month later, with Capitan once again winning a decision.

He signed a contract with ONE Championship in January 2020.

Capitan was scheduled to fight the former Enfusion and Wu Lin Feng champion Petchtanong Banchamek at ONE Championship: A New Breed 3. He set a ONE Super Series record by knocking Petchtanong  out with the first punch of the fight, after just 6 seconds.

In October 2020, Capitan fought Chamuaktong Fightermuaythai in the Rangsit Stadium. He won the fight by decision.

Capitan is expected to face Sangmanee Sor Tienpo in a Petchyindee Promotions event on December 11, 2020. He won the fight, and the vacant True4U super lightweight title, by decision.

On January 22, 2021, Capitan defeated Alaverdi Ramazanov by KO via leg kicks for the ONE Bantamweight Kickboxing World Championship at ONE Championship: Unbreakable.

Capitan faced Nuenglanlek Jitmuangnon on March 26, 2021, in a True4U event. After a controversial final round, the bout ended in a draw. Subsequently, Capitan's manager insinuated that the fighter would be fighting exclusively in ONE Championship.

Capitan was next scheduled to defend his ONE Bantamweight Kickboxing World Championship against Mehdi Zatout at ONE Championship: Revolution on September 24, 2021. He won the fight by unanimous decision.

Capitan made his second title defense against Hiroki Akimoto at ONE: X on March 25, 2022. He lost the fight by unanimous decision, after losing the final four rounds of the bout. Capitan was twice warned for illegal clinching and was deducted a point for it in the fourth round.

Capitan faced Alaverdi Ramazanov at ONE 161 on September 29, 2022. He lost the close bout via split decision.

Due to a disagreement between his gym, Petchyindee Academy, and ONE Championship, all Petchyindee fighters were released from the promotion at the request of the gym.

Championships and accomplishments

Muay Thai
Professional
 Professional Boxing Association of Thailand (PAT)
 2016 Thailand 154 lbs Champion
Siam Omnoi Stadium
 2016 Isuzu Cup Runner-up
 World Professional Muaythai Federation (WPMF)
 2016 WPMF World Super Welterweight 154 lbs Champion
 True4U Muaymanwansuk 
 2019 True4U Middleweight 160 lbs Champion
 2020 True4U Super Lightweight 140 lbs Champion
 Lumpinee Stadium
 2019 Lumpinee Stadium Super Welterweight −70 kg (154 lbs) Champion (1 Defense)

Amateur
International Federation of Muaythai Associations
 2021 IFMA World Championships −67 kg  & Most Outstanding Athlete Award
 2022 IFMA World Championships −67 kg 
World Games
 2017 IFMA Muay Thai at the World Games -67 kg 
 2022 IFMA Muay Thai at the World Games -67 kg 
Southeast Asian Games
 2017 Southeast Asian Games Muay Thai -71 kg

Kickboxing
 ONE Championship
 2021 ONE Bantamweight Kickboxing World Champion (1 Defense)
Beyond Kickboxing
2022 Beyond Kick "Fight of the Year"

Fight record

|-  style="background:#cfc;"
| 2023-03-11|| Win ||align=left| Nuenglanlek Jitmuangnon || RWS + Petchyindee, Rajadamnern Stadium || Bangkok, Thailand || Decision (Unanimous) || 3 ||3:00 
|-  style="background:#cfc"
| 2022-12-28 || Win||align=left| Thaksinlek Kiatniwat || Muay Thai Rakya Soosakon + SAT Super Fight Withee Tin Thai + Petchyindee  || Bangkok, Thailand || KO (Straight to the body) || 3 ||1:18

|-  style="background:#fbb;"
| 2022-09-29 || Loss ||align=left| Alaverdi Ramazanov || ONE 161 || Kallang, Singapore || Decision (Split) || 3 || 3:00 
|-
|-  style="background:#fbb;"
| 2022-03-25|| Loss ||align=left| Hiroki Akimoto || ONE: X || Kallang, Singapore || Decision (Unanimous) || 5 || 3:00
|-
! style=background:white colspan=9 |
|-  style="background:#cfc;"
| 2021-09-24|| Win ||align=left| Mehdi Zatout || ONE Championship: Revolution || Singapore || Decision || 5 || 3:00
|-
! style=background:white colspan=9 |
|-  style="background:#c5d2ea;"
| 2021-03-26|| Draw ||align=left| Nuenglanlek Jitmuangnon || Muaymumwansuk True4u, Rangsit Stadium || Rangsit, Thailand || Decision || 5 || 3:00
|-  style="background:#cfc;"
| 2021-01-22|| Win ||align=left| Alaverdi Ramazanov || ONE Championship: Unbreakable || Kallang, Singapore || KO (Leg Kick + right cross) || 2 || 1:56
|-
! style=background:white colspan=9 |
|-  style="background:#cfc;"
| 2020-12-11||Win
| align="left" | Sangmanee Sor.Cafemuaythai || Muaymumwansuk True4u, Rangsit Stadium|| Rangsit, Thailand ||Decision
|5
|3:00
|-
! style=background:white colspan=9 |
|-  style="background:#cfc;"
| 2020-10-02|| Win ||align=left| Chamuaktong Fightermuaythai || Muaymumwansuk True4u, Rangsit Stadium|| Rangsit, Thailand || Decision || 5 || 3:00
|-  style="background:#cfc;"
| 2020-09-18|| Win ||align=left| Petchtanong Banchamek || ONE Championship: A New Breed 3 || Bangkok, Thailand || KO (Right cross) || 1 || 0:06
|-  style="background:#cfc;"
| 2020-02-07|| Win ||align=left| Yodkhunpon Sitmonchai || Lumpinee Stadium || Bangkok, Thailand || Decision || 5 || 3:00
|-  style="background:#cfc;"
| 2020-01-03|| Win ||align=left| Yodkhunpon Sitmonchai || Lumpinee Stadium || Bangkok, Thailand || Decision || 5 || 3:00
|-
! style=background:white colspan=9 |
|-  style="background:#cfc;"
| 2019-11-22|| Win ||align=left| Shahoo Gheisarian ||  Toyota Marathon|| Chonburi Province, Thailand || Decision || 5 || 3:00
|-
! style=background:white colspan=9 |
|-  style="background:#cfc;"
| 2019-10-28|| Win ||align=left| Mojtaba Taravati || Muay Thai Super Champ || Bangkok, Thailand || Decision|| 3 || 3:00
|-  style="background:#cfc;"
| 2019-09-06|| Win ||align=left| Meng Qinghao || Wu Lin Feng 2019: WLF at Lumpinee – China vs Thailand || Bangkok, Thailand || Decision|| 3 || 3:00
|-  style="background:#cfc;"
| 2019-08-18|| Win ||align=left| Sophea Meun || Muay Thai Super Champ || Bangkok, Thailand || TKO (Punches)|| 2 ||
|-  style="background:#cfc;"
| 2019-06-01|| Win ||align=left| Dechrid Sathian Muaythai Gym || Lumpinee Stadium || Bangkok, Thailand || Decision || 5 || 3:00
|-
! style=background:white colspan=9 |
|-  style="background:#cfc;"
| 2019-04-21|| Win ||align=left| Luca Lombardo || Muay Thai Super Champ || Bangkok, Thailand || Decision || 3 || 3:00
|-  style="background:#cfc;"
| 2019-03-17|| Win ||align=left| Keivan Soleimani  || Muay Thai Super Champ || Bangkok, Thailand || Decision || 3 || 3:00
|-  style="background:#cfc;"
| 2018-12-16 || Win ||align=left| Roeung Sophorn || SeaTV Khmer Boxing|| Cambodia || Decision || 5 || 3:00
|-  style="background:#fbb;"
| 2018-03-17|| Loss||align=left| Yodkhunpon Sitmonchai || Topking World Series 18, Semi Final ||  Thailand || Decision || 3 || 3:00
|-  style="background:#cfc;"
| 2017-12-15|| Win ||align=left| Patryk Beszta || MX Muay Xtreme || Thailand || Decision || 5 || 3:00
|-  style="background:#cfc;"
| 2017-02-06|| Win ||align=left| Yurik Davtyan || Nimbutr Stadium – Muaythai Day, Final || Bangkok, Thailand || Decision || 3 || 3:00
|-  style="background:#fbb;"
| 2016-12-17|| Loss ||align=left| Saensatharn P.K. Saenchai Muaythaigym || Omnoi Stadium || Bangkok, Thailand || Decision || 5 || 3:00
|-  style="background:#cfc;"
| 2016-09-10|| Win||align=left| Talaytong Sor.Thanaphet || Lumpinee Stadium ||  Bangkok, Thailand || KO || 4 ||
|-  style="background:#fbb;"
| 2016-08-22|| Loss ||align=left| Talaytong Sor.Thanaphet ||  || Krasang District, Thailand || KO || 4 ||
|-  style="background:#cfc;"
| 2016-07-26|| Win||align=left| Dechrid Sathian Muaythai Gym || Prince's Birthday ||  Bangkok, Thailand || Decision || 5 || 3:00 
|-
! style=background:white colspan=9 |
|-  style="background:#cfc;"
| 2016-07-03|| Win||align=left| Kwanchai Petchniroth || Rangsit Stadium||  Thailand || Decision || 5 || 3:00
|-  style="background:#cfc;"
| 2016-05-22|| Win||align=left| Sang-Uthai Sor.Jor.Piek-Uthai || Channel 7 Stadium ||  Bangkok, Thailand || KO || 3 ||
|-  style="background:#fbb;"
| 2016-02-27|| Loss||align=left| Por.Tor.Thor. Petchrungruang || Omnoi Stadium – Isuzu Cup Final ||  Samut Sakhon, Thailand || Decision || 5 ||3:00
|-
! style=background:white colspan=9 |
|-  style="background:#cfc;"
| 2015-12-26|| Win ||align=left| Yodkhunpon Sitmonchai || Omnoi Stadium – Isuzu Cup ||  Bangkok, Thailand || Decision || 5 ||3:00
|-  style="background:#fbb;"
| 2015-09-12|| Loss||align=left| Por.Tor.Thor. Petchrungruang || Omnoi Stadium ||  Samut Sakhon, Thailand || Decision || 5 ||3:00
|-  style="background:#cfc;"
| 2015-08-15|| Win ||align=left| Auisiewpor Sujibamikiew || Omnoi Stadium ||  Bangkok, Thailand || Decision || 5 ||3:00
|-  style="background:#fbb;"
| 2014-12-03|| Loss ||align=left| Manasak Sor.Jor.Lekmuangnon || Rajadamnern Stadium ||  Bangkok, Thailand || Decision || 5 ||3:00
|-  style="background:#cfc;"
| 2014-10-06|| Win ||align=left| Nopakrit Kor.Kumpanart	 || Rajadamnern Stadium ||  Bangkok, Thailand || Decision || 5 ||3:00
|-  style="background:#cfc;"
| 2013-11-15|| Win ||align=left| Petasawin Seatranferry	 || Lumpinee Stadium ||  Bangkok, Thailand || KO (Punches)|| 4 ||
|-  style="background:#fbb;"
| 2013-06-29 || Loss||align=left| Fabio Pinca || MAX Muay Thai 2, Semi Finals || Pattaya, Thailand || Decision || 3 || 3:00
|-  style="background:#cfc;"
| 2013-05-31 || Win ||align=left| Chok Sagami || Lumpinee Stadium || Bangkok, Thailand || Decision || 5 || 3:00
|-  style="background:#cfc;"
| 2013-04-05 || Win ||align=left| Pakorn PKSaenchaimuaythaigym || Lumpinee Stadium || Bangkok, Thailand || Decision || 5 || 3:00
|-  style="background:#fbb;"
| 2013-01-26 || Loss||align=left| Saenchai || Yokkao Extreme 2013 || Milan, Italy || Decision (unanimous) || 5 || 3:00
|-  style="background:#fbb;"
| 2012-12-07 || Loss||align=left| Petchboonchu FA Group || Lumpinee Stadium || Bangkok, Thailand || Decision || 5 || 3:00 
|-
! style=background:white colspan=9 | 
|-  style="background:#cfc;"
| 2012-10-12 || Win ||align=left| Damien Alamos || Lumpinee Stadium || Bangkok, Thailand || Decision || 5 || 3:00
|-  style="background:#cfc;"
| 2012-09-07 || Win ||align=left| F-16 Rachanon || Lumpinee Stadium || Bangkok, Thailand || TKO || 5 ||
|-  style="background:#cfc;"
| 2012-07-31 || Win ||align=left| F-16 Rachanon || Lumpinee Stadium || Bangkok, Thailand || KO (High Kick)|| 3 ||
|-  style="background:#fbb;"
| 2011-09-23 || Loss||align=left| Damien Alamos || Kiatphet Fight, Lumpinee Stadium || Bangkok, Thailand || Decision || 5 || 3:00
|-
! style=background:white colspan=9 |
|-  style="background:#cfc;"
| 2011-06-22 || Win ||align=left| Dung Kiatrenchai || Pattaya Stadium || Pattaya, Thailand || TKO || 4 ||
|-
| colspan=9 | Legend:    

|-  style="background:#cfc;"
| 2022-07-17|| Win ||align=left| Rachid Hamza || IFMA at the 2022 World Games, Final|| Birmingham, Alabama, United States ||  Decision (30:27) || 3 ||3:00 
|-
! style=background:white colspan=9 |

|-  style="background:#cfc;"
| 2022-07-16|| Win ||align=left| Spéth Norbert Attila || IFMA at the 2022 World Games, Semi Finals|| Birmingham, Alabama, United States || Decision (30:27) || 3 ||3:00

|-  style="background:#cfc;"
| 2022-07-15||Win||align=left| Dimos Asimakopoulos ||IFMA at the 2022 World Games, Quarter Finals|| Birmingham, Alabama, United States || Decision (30:27) || 3 ||3:00

|-  style="background:#cfc;"
| 2022-06-04|| Win||align=left| Zhanibek Kanatbayev || IFMA Senior World Championships 2022, Final|| Abu Dhabi, United Arab Emirates || KO (Body shot) || 2 ||
|-
! style=background:white colspan=9 |

|-  style="background:#cfc;"
| 2022-06-02|| Win ||align=left| Oskar S. || IFMA Senior World Championships 2022, Semi Finals|| Abu Dhabi, United Arab Emirates || Decision ||3  ||3:00

|-  style="background:#cfc;"
| 2022-05-31||Win||align=left| Benjamin Cant || IFMA Senior World Championships 2022, Quarter Finals|| Abu Dhabi, United Arab Emirates || Decision (Unanimous) || 3 ||3:00

|-  style="background:#cfc;"
| 2022-05-28||Win||align=left| Kenny Hong || IFMA Senior World Championships 2022, Second Round|| Abu Dhabi, United Arab Emirates || Decision (Unanimous) || 3 ||3:00

|-  style="background:#cfc;"
| 2021-12-11 || Win||align=left| Spéth Norbert Attila|| 2021 IFMA World Championships, Final  || Bangkok, Thailand || Decision (Unanimous)|| 3 ||
|-
! style=background:white colspan=9 |

|-  style="background:#cfc;"
| 2021-12-10 || Win ||align=left| Dmitry Varats || 2021 IFMA World Championships, Semi Finals  || Bangkok, Thailand ||Decision (Split)|| 3 || 3:00

|-  style="background:#cfc;"
| 2021-12-09 || Win ||align=left| Oskar S. || 2021 IFMA World Championships, Quarter Finals  || Bangkok, Thailand ||Decision  (Unanimous)|| 3 || 3:00

|-  style="background:#cfc;"
| 2021-12-08 || Win ||align=left| Erdem Taha Dincer || 2021 IFMA World Championships, Second Round || Bangkok, Thailand ||Decision  (Unanimous)|| 3 || 3:00

|-  style="background:#cfc;"
| 2021-12-06 || Win ||align=left| Mohammed Bin Mahmoud || 2021 IFMA World Championships, First Round || Bangkok, Thailand || TKO (Low Kicks) || 1 ||

|-  style="background:#cfc;"
| 2017-08-29 || Win||align=left| Meun Sophea || 2017 Southeast Asian Games, Final || Kuala Lumpur, Malaysia || Decision  || 3 || 3:00
|-
! style=background:white colspan=9 |

|-  style="background:#cfc;"
| 2017-08-28 || Win||align=left| Trương Quốc Hưng || 2017 Southeast Asian Games, Semi Finals || Kuala Lumpur, Malaysia || Decision  || 3 || 3:00

|-  style="background:#fbb;"
| 2017-07-29 || Loss ||align=left| Sergey Kulyaba ||  I.F.M.A. World Muaythai at The World Games 2017, Semi Finals || Wroclaw, Poland || Decision (29:28) || 3 || 3:00
|-
! style=background:white colspan=9 |

|-  style="background:#cfc;"
| 2017-07-28 || Win ||align=left| Pavel Hryshanovich ||  I.F.M.A. World Muaythai at The World Games 2017, Quarter Finals || Wroclaw, Poland || RSC || 1 || 
|-
| colspan=9 | Legend:

See also
List of male kickboxers

References

External links
ONE Championship profile

Capitan Petchyindee Academy
Living people
1993 births
ONE Championship kickboxers
Capitan Petchyindee Academy
Capitan Petchyindee Academy
ONE Championship champions